K. Ganapathy is an Indian Politician Member of Legislative Assembly of Tamil Nadu. He was elected from Maduravoyal  as an Dravida Munnetra Kazhagam candidate in 2021.

Electoral performance

References 

Tamil Nadu MLAs 2021–2026
Living people
Dravida Munnetra Kazhagam politicians
Year of birth missing (living people)